Syncosmia eugerys is a moth in the family Geometridae. It is found in New Guinea and on Seram.

References

Moths described in 1929
Eupitheciini